Lynda is a spelling variation of the feminine given name Linda. Notable people with the name include:

People

Arts and entertainment
 Lynda Adams, later Hunt (1920–1997), Canadian diver
 Lynda Baron (1939–2022), British television actress
 Lynda Barry (born 1956), American cartoonist and author
 Lynda Bellingham (1948–2014), Canadian-born British actress
 Lynda Bryans (born 1962), Northern Irish television presenter and journalist
 Lynda Carter (born 1951), American television actress who played Wonder Woman in the 1970s
 Lynda Chouiten, Algerian writer in French
 Lynda Day George (born 1944), American television actress popular in the 1960s and 1970s
 Lynda Trang Đài (born 1968), Vietnamese American singer
 Lynda Ghazzali, Malaysian porcelain painter
 Lynda Gibson (1956–2004), Australian comedian and actress
 Lynda Goodfriend (born 1953), American actress
 Lynda Kay, American contralto singer, songwriter, guitarist, actor and business owner
 Lynda La Plante (born 1943), British author known for the Prime Suspect television series
 Lynda Laurence (born 1949), American singer
 Lynda Lemay (born 1966), Canadian francophone singer-songwriter
 Lynda Lopez (born 1971), a.k.a. "Ly Lo", American broadcaster and journalist
 Lynda Mendelson, American former child actress
 Lynda Myles (British producer) (born 1947), British writer and producer
 Lynda Myles (American writer) (born 1939), American writer and actress
 Lynda Obst (born 1950), American feature film producer and author
 Lynda Randle (born 1962), African American singer of southern gospel music
 Lynda Squires (born 1951), Canadian pop singer
 Lynda Stipe (born 1962), American singer and bass guitarist
 Lynda Thalie (born 1978), Canadian singer-songwriter of Algerian origin
 Lynda Thomas (born 1981), Mexican Eurodance and rock musician popular in the 1990s
 Lynda Topp (born 1958), is one half of the Topp Twins, a New Zealand music comedy duo
 Lynda Weinman (born 1955), American entrepreneur, author, and co-founder of the  Lynda.com online training library
 Lynda Williams (born 1958), Canadian science fiction author and blogger
 Lynda Wiesmeier (1963–2012), American model and actress
Lynda Badmus Designer and Mathematics Educator

Business and economy
 Lynda Weinman (born 1955), American business owner, computer instructor, and author

Politics
 Lynda Blanchard (born 1959), American businesswoman, diplomat
 Lynda Boudreau (born 1952), American politician in Minnesota. She served in the Minnesota House of Representatives
 Lynda Chalker, Baroness Chalker of Wallasey (born 1942), British conservative politician
 Lynda Chuba-Ikpeazu (born 1966), Nigerian politician
 Lynda Lovejoy (born 1949), American politician
 Lynda Pope (born 1953), née Maddern, Australian chess player
 Lynda Bird Johnson Robb (née Johnson; born 1944), elder daughter of U.S. President Lyndon B. Johnson and his First Lady Lady Bird Johnson

Sports
 Lynda Blutreich (born 1971), American javelin thrower 
 Lynda Folauhola (born 1980), also known as Lynda Dackiw, Australian diver
 Lynda Kiejko (born 1980), Canadian pistol sport shooter
 Lynda Prichard (born 1950), New Zealand cricketer
 Lynda Sutfin (born 1962), American javelin thrower
 Lynda Tolbert-Goode (born 1967), American hurdler

Others
 Lynda Lyon Block (1948–2002), American convicted murderer
 Lynda Chin (born 1968), Chinese-American medical doctor
 Lynda Gratton (born 1955), British organizational theorist, consultant and professor

See also
 "Lynda" (Steve Wariner song), released in 1987
 Lynda (album), debut album of Lynda Thomas, released in 1996
 lynda.com, the former name of the online education site, LinkedIn Learning
 Lynda Van der Klok, a fictional character of the Halloween film series

Feminine given names